Rongjiawan is a town and the county seat of Yueyang in Hunan, China. The town was reformed through the amalgamation of Chengguan Town (knowsn as Rongjiawan), Lujiao Town and Matang Town on November 30, 2015. Through the amalgamation of villages in 2016, it has 19 villages and 24 communities under its jurisdiction, its seat is at Chezhan Rd..

Geography
Rongjiawan is located in the northwestern Yueyang County, on the eastern bank of Dongting Lake, the Xiang River flows through the south western margin of the town. It is bordered by Zhongzhou Township to the southwest and northwest, Yueyanglou District to the northeast, Xinkai Town to the east, Xinqiang and Huangshajie towns to southeast and south.

Amalgamation of villages in 2016

External links
 Official Website (Chinese / 中文)

References

Divisions of Yueyang County
County seats in Hunan